The Soul Survivors are an American, Philadelphia-based, soul and R&B group, founded by New York natives Richie and Charlie Ingui along with Kenny Jeremiah.  The Soul Survivors are known for their 1967 hit single Expressway to Your Heart, which was the first hit by Philadelphia soul record producers and songwriters Kenny Gamble and Leon Huff. The Soul Survivors are still performing and recording new music and covers, most recently working with David Uosikkinen of The Hooters and his project "In the Pocket" which is paying tribute to the vast catalog of music created in Philadelphia.

History
The Soul Survivors first played together in New York under the name The Dedications, founded by Kenny Jeremiah, who released several singles under this name in 1962 and 1964. They adopted the name Soul Survivors in 1965.  They signed to Philadelphia label Crimson Records, who put them in touch with Gamble & Huff. Expressway to Your Heart was a #1 hit regionally in Philadelphia and New York in the fall of 1967, and the tune reached #4 on the Billboard Hot 100 nationally. Expressway to Your Heart spent 15 weeks in the charts and sold over one million copies.

The follow-up was Explosion in Your Soul, which was not as successful (U.S. #33); a third release, Impossible Mission, also was a minor hit in 1969 (U.S. #68). They quit playing for a few years, but re-formed with a different lineup in 1972. They had one more hit, City of Brotherly Love in 1974. In the 1970s, the group lost its record contract and its manager and eventually disbanded. Charlie Ingui became a landscaper, Richie Ingui became a house painter, Paul Venturini became a restaurateur, and drummer Joe Forgione owned an auto body shop. At that time, Steely Dan noted in their song Hey Nineteen: "It's hard times befallen the Soul Survivors".

In 1987, the Inqui brothers began playing occasional gigs as the original Soul Survivors and signed a five-record contract in 1991 with Society Hill Records. As of 2006, they were playing occasional dates in the Eastern United States. Chuck Trois also went on to release a solo 45 rpm single on A&M Records in August 1969, with Mr. Holmes on one side, and A National Band on the other.

Paul Venturini (b. June 10, 1945) died on April 17, 2001. Richie Ingui died of heart failure on January 13, 2017, at the age of 70. Jeremiah died of COVID-19 on December 4, 2020, at age 78.

Members
Charlie Ingui - vocals - original member *
Richie Ingui - vocals (born Richard Ingui in Manhattan, New York; November 15, 1947 – January 13, 2017) - original member*
Kenny Jeremiah - vocals (born Kenneth Scott Jeremiah in Northfield, New Jersey; November 22, 1942 – December 4, 2020) - original member*
Joe Forgione - drums - original member*
Paul Venturini - organ - original member*
Chuck Trois - guitar 
Edward Leonetti - guitar
John (Beedo) Dzubak Sr. - drums
 Sal Rota - keyboards
 Novac Noury (Jerry Noury) - organ and bass pedals during 1966
 Neil Larsen - keyboards (1974 album)
 Mario Flamini-Drums
 Kevin Irvine-Keyboards,Vocals
 Frank Pagliante-Bass
 Mike DiMartinis-Guitar,Vocals
 David Kershner-Trumpet
 Jim Verdeur-Saxophones

Discography

Albums

Singles

Note
The Soul Survivors are not to be confused with the 1960s Denver-based garage rock band, also known as the Soul Survivors. The band included Bob Raymond, who was later with Sugarloaf.

References

American rhythm and blues musical groups
Musical groups from Philadelphia
Philadelphia International Records artists